Ron miel ("Honey rum") is a variety of rum made from liquor or cane molasses, typical from the Canary Islands. It is known as honey rum because the final product incorporates an amount of at least 2% honey of the total volume.

Its alcoholic graduation ranges from 20 to 30%. It is of intense and sweet flavor, and its color goes from the old gold to the intense mahogany. It's mostly consumed through shots, often with a sprinkle of lime juice

In 2005 the Ministry of Agriculture of the Government of the Canary Islands created a specific Geographical Denomination for the honey rum under the name "Ronmiel de Canarias".

References 

Rums
Honey liqueurs and spirits